The Basel problem is a problem in mathematical analysis with relevance to number theory, concerning an infinite sum of inverse squares. It was first posed by Pietro Mengoli in 1650 and solved by Leonhard Euler in 1734, and read on 5 December 1735 in The Saint Petersburg Academy of Sciences. Since the problem had withstood the attacks of the leading mathematicians of the day, Euler's solution brought him immediate fame when he was twenty-eight. Euler generalised the problem considerably, and his ideas were taken up years later by Bernhard Riemann in his seminal 1859 paper "On the Number of Primes Less Than a Given Magnitude", in which he defined his zeta function and proved its basic properties. The problem is named after Basel, hometown of Euler as well as of the Bernoulli family who unsuccessfully attacked the problem.

The Basel problem asks for the precise summation of the reciprocals of the squares of the natural numbers, i.e. the precise sum of the infinite series:

The sum of the series is approximately equal to 1.644934. The Basel problem asks for the exact sum of this series (in closed form), as well as a proof that this sum is correct. Euler found the exact sum to be  and announced this discovery in 1735. His arguments were based on manipulations that were not justified at the time, although he was later proven correct. He produced a truly rigorous proof in 1741.

The solution to this problem can be used to estimate the probability that two large random numbers are coprime.

Euler's approach
Euler's original derivation of the value  essentially extended observations about finite polynomials and assumed that these same properties hold true for infinite series.

Of course, Euler's original reasoning requires justification (100 years later, Karl Weierstrass proved that Euler's representation of the sine function as an infinite product is valid, by the Weierstrass factorization theorem), but even without justification, by simply obtaining the correct value, he was able to verify it numerically against partial sums of the series. The agreement he observed gave him sufficient confidence to announce his result to the mathematical community.

To follow Euler's argument, recall the Taylor series expansion of the sine function

Dividing through by  gives

The Weierstrass factorization theorem shows that the left-hand side is the product of linear factors given by its roots, just as for finite polynomials. Euler assumed this as a heuristic for expanding an infinite degree polynomial in terms of its roots, but in fact is not always true for general . This factorization expands the equation into:

These two coefficients must be equal; thus,

Multiplying both sides of this equation by −2 gives the sum of the reciprocals of the positive square integers.

This method of calculating  is detailed in expository fashion most notably in Havil's Gamma book which details many zeta function and logarithm-related series and integrals, as well as a historical perspective, related to the Euler gamma constant.

Generalizations of Euler's method using elementary symmetric polynomials

Using formulae obtained from elementary symmetric polynomials, this same approach can be used to enumerate formulae for the even-indexed even zeta constants which have the following known formula expanded by the Bernoulli numbers:

Then using known formulas for elementary symmetric polynomials (a.k.a., Newton's formulas expanded in terms of power sum identities), we can see (for example) that

There are other forms of Newton's identities expressing the (finite) power sums  in terms of the elementary symmetric polynomials,  but we can go a more direct route to expressing non-recursive formulas for  using the method of elementary symmetric polynomials. Namely, we have a recurrence relation between the elementary symmetric polynomials and the power sum polynomials given as on this page by

which in our situation equates to the limiting recurrence relation (or generating function convolution, or product) expanded as

Then by differentiation and rearrangement of the terms in the previous equation, we obtain that

Consequences of Euler's proof
In particular, since  and integer powers of it are transcendental, we can conclude at this point that  is irrational, and more precisely, transcendental for all . By contrast, the properties of the odd-indexed zeta constants, including Apéry's constant , are almost completely unknown.

The Riemann zeta function 
The Riemann zeta function  is one of the most significant functions in mathematics because of its relationship to the distribution of the prime numbers. The zeta function is defined for any complex number  with real part greater than 1 by the following formula:

Taking , we see that  is equal to the sum of the reciprocals of the squares of all positive integers:

Convergence can be proven by the integral test, or by the following inequality:

This gives us the upper bound 2, and because the infinite sum contains no negative terms, it must converge to a value strictly between 0 and 2. It can be shown that  has a simple expression in terms of the Bernoulli numbers whenever  is a positive even integer. With :

A proof using Euler's formula and L'Hôpital's rule

The normalized sinc function  has a Weierstrass factorization representation as an infinite product:

The infinite product is analytic, so taking the natural logarithm of both sides and differentiating yields

(by uniform convergence, the interchange of the derivative and infinite series is permissible).

We make a change of variables:

Euler's formula can be used to deduce that

or using the corresponding hyperbolic function:

Then

Now we take the limit as  approaches zero and use L'Hôpital's rule thrice.

A proof using Fourier series

Use Parseval's identity (applied to the function ) to obtain

where

Thus,

and

Therefore,

as required.

Another proof using Parseval's identity

where  is defined in terms of the inner product on this Hilbert space given by

We can consider the orthonormal basis on this space defined by  such that . Then if we take , we can compute both that

by elementary calculus and integration by parts, respectively. Finally, by Parseval's identity stated in the form above, we obtain that

Generalizations and recurrence relations
Note that by considering higher-order powers of  we can use integration by parts to extend this method to enumerating formulas for  when . In particular, suppose we let

so that integration by parts yields the recurrence relation that

Then by applying Parseval's identity as we did for the first case above along with the linearity of the inner product yields that

Cauchy's proof
While most proofs use results from advanced mathematics, such as Fourier analysis, complex analysis, and multivariable calculus, the following does not even require single-variable calculus (until a single limit is taken at the end).

For a proof using the residue theorem, see the linked article.

History of this proof
The proof goes back to Augustin Louis Cauchy (Cours d'Analyse, 1821, Note VIII). In 1954, this proof appeared in the book of Akiva and Isaak Yaglom "Nonelementary Problems in an Elementary Exposition". Later, in 1982, it appeared in the journal Eureka, attributed to John Scholes, but Scholes claims he learned the proof from Peter Swinnerton-Dyer, and in any case he maintains the proof was "common knowledge at Cambridge in the late 1960s".

The proof

The main idea behind the proof is to bound the partial (finite) sums

The two expressions are derived from identities involving the cotangent and cosecant functions. These identities are in turn derived from de Moivre's formula, and we now turn to establishing these identities.

Then from de Moivre's formula and the definition of the cotangent function, we have

From the binomial theorem, we have

Combining the two equations and equating imaginary parts gives the identity

So,

for every . The values  are distinct numbers in the interval . By the above equation, these  numbers are the roots of the th degree polynomial

By Vieta's formulas we can calculate the sum of the roots directly by examining the first two coefficients of the polynomial, and this comparison shows that

Substituting the identity , we have

Now consider the inequality  (illustrated geometrically above). If we add up all these inequalities for each of the numbers , and if we use the two identities above, we get

As  approaches infinity, the left and right hand expressions each approach , so by the squeeze theorem,

and this completes the proof.

Proof assuming Weil's conjecture on Tamagawa numbers
A proof is also possible assuming Weil's conjecture on Tamagawa numbers.  The conjecture asserts for the case of the algebraic group SL2(R) that the Tamagawa number of the group is one.  That is, the quotient of the special linear group over the rational adeles by the special linear group of the rationals (a compact set, because  is a lattice in the adeles) has Tamagawa measure 1:
 

To determine a Tamagawa measure, the group  consists of matrices

An invariant volume form on the group is

For the local factors,

Also, a standard computation shows that . Putting these together gives .

At the infinite place, an integral computation over the fundamental domain of  shows that , and therefore the Weil conjecture finally gives

Other identities
See the special cases of the identities for the Riemann zeta function when  Other notably special identities and representations of this constant appear in the sections below.

Series representations
The following are series representations of the constant:

Integral representations

The following are integral representations of

Continued fractions
In particular, he documents recurrence relations for almost integer sequences converging to the constant and continued fractions for the constant. Other continued fractions for this constant include

and

See also
Riemann zeta function
Apéry's constant
List of sums of reciprocals

References
 .
 .
 .
 
 .

Notes

External links
 An infinite series of surprises by C. J. Sangwin
 From ζ(2) to Π. The Proof. step-by-step proof
 , English translation with notes of Euler's paper by Lucas Willis and Thomas J. Osler
 
 
  (fourteen proofs)
 Visualization of Euler's factorization of the sine function
 
  (animated proof based on the above)

Articles containing proofs
Mathematical problems
Number theory
Pi algorithms
Squares in number theory
Zeta and L-functions